John Stroeder (born July 24, 1958) is an American former professional basketball player. Born in Bremerton, Washington, he attended the University of Montana.

Despite being taken in the draft in 1980 (by the Portland Trail Blazers), the 6'10" power forward began his short NBA career with the Milwaukee Bucks in the 1987-88 season, appearing in 41 games and averaging 1.9 points and 1.7 rebounds per contest. After the season, he was selected in the 1988 expansion draft by one of the league's two newest franchises, the Miami Heat, but did not play a game for them. He split his final season in 1988-89 with the Golden State Warriors and San Antonio Spurs, playing five total games.

He also played with the Continental Basketball Association's Albany Patroons.

, Stroeder was the head boys basketball coach at his alma mater, Port Townsend High School in Port Townsend, Washington.
He led the Redskins to a 23–3 record and a sixth-place finish at the 2008 Class 2A State Basketball Tournament and a 23–4 record and a third-place finish at the 2009 Class 1A State Basketball Tournament.

References

External links
NBA stats @ basketballreference.com

1958 births
Living people
Albany Patroons players
Alviks BK players
American expatriate basketball people in France
American expatriate basketball people in Spain
American expatriate basketball people in Sweden
American expatriate basketball people in the United Kingdom
American men's basketball players
Basketball players from Washington (state)
Real Betis Baloncesto players
Golden State Warriors players
High school basketball coaches in the United States
Liga ACB players
Miami Heat expansion draft picks
Milwaukee Bucks players
CEP Lorient players
Montana Golden Nuggets players
Montana Grizzlies basketball players
People from Bremerton, Washington
People from Port Townsend, Washington
Portland Trail Blazers draft picks
Power forwards (basketball)
Rapid City Thrillers players
San Antonio Spurs players